Below the line may refer to:

Below the line (filmmaking), a film's budget excluding actors, producers, director, and writers
Below the line (advertising), advertising not involving mass media
A type of contract bridge scoring
The group voting ticket, option in Australian elections
 Below the Line (1925 film), a 1925 silent film
 Below the Line (2003 film), a 2003 Croatian film

See also
Above the line (disambiguation)